The 12359 / 60 Kolkata Patna Garib Rath Express is a Superfast Express train of the Garib Rath series belonging to Indian Railways - Eastern Railway zone that runs between Kolkata and Patna Junction in India.

It operates as train number 12359 from Kolkata to Patna Junction and as train number 12360 in the reverse direction serving the states of West Bengal, Jharkhand & Bihar.

It is part of the Garib Rath Express series launched by the former railway minister of India, Mr. Laloo Prasad Yadav.

Coaches
The 12359 / 60 Kolkata Patna Garib Rath Express has 9 AC 3 tier & 2 End on Generator Coaches. It does not carry a Pantry car coach.

As is customary with most train services in India, Coach Composition may be amended at the discretion of Indian Railways depending on demand.

Service

As the average speed of the train is above , as per Indian Railways rules, its fare includes a Superfast surcharge.

Routeing
The 12359 / 60 Kolkata Patna Garib Rath Express runs from Kolkata via Durgapur, Asansol Junction, Jhajha, Mokama Junction, Rajendranagar Terminus to Patna Junction.

Traction
As the route is fully electrified, a Howrah based WAP 4 or WAP 5 or WAP 7 locomotive powers the train for its entire journey.

Operation
12359 Kolkata Patna Garib Rath Express leaves Kolkata every Tuesday, Thursday & Saturday arriving Patna Junction the next day.

12360 Patna Kolkata Garib Rath Express leaves Patna Junction every Wednesday, Friday & Sunday arriving Kolkata the next day.

References

External links

Indianrail.gov.in
Youtube.com
News.oneindia.in
Flickr.com

Transport in Kolkata
Transport in Patna
Garib Rath Express trains
Rail transport in West Bengal
Rail transport in Jharkhand
Rail transport in Bihar
Railway services introduced in 2008